The Railway Department of the Office of the Governor-General of Taiwan is a National Historic Site in Taiwan, also known as the Taihoku Railway Bureau or the  Railway Department of the Office of the Governor-General of Taiwan's Bureau of Transportation. The site, near the Taipei North Gate, was in use for railway administration during the late Qing dynasty, but the extant building is a Japanese colonial administrative building in Taipei dating from 1919. It was granted national monument status in 2007, and is a part of the National Taiwan Museum.

References

 1919 establishments in Taiwan
 2007 establishments in Taiwan
 Museums established in 2007
 Railway museums in Taiwan
 National monuments of Taiwan
 Taiwan under Japanese rule